Leena Bhagwat is a Marathi television, theatre, and film actress. She is known for playing the character of Sharayu in Honar Sun Me Hya Gharchi. She also participated in Fu Bai Fu as a contestant. As of now, she is playing the role of Suvarna Kanitkar in Thipkyanchi Rangoli.

Personal life
Bhagwat is married to Marathi play director Mangesh Kadam.

Career
Bhagwat currently appears in a Marathi serial, Thipkyanchi Rangoli, on star pravah.

Filmography

Films

Plays
Gosht Tashi Gamtichi
Adhantar
Chal Tujhi Seat Pakki
Vaishali Cottage

Television

Awards
 ‘संस्कृती कलादर्पण गौरव रजनी २०१५’ - Best Actress 
 Akhil Bhartiy Natya Parishad - Special prize 
 Best Mother-in-law in Zee Marathi Awards 2015

References

External links

 

Living people
Marathi people
Actresses in Marathi cinema
Actresses in Marathi theatre
1976 births